James May: Our Man in... is a travel documentary series hosted by James May and released via Amazon Prime Video. Each season follows May as he travels a country and undergoes various local activities.

In the first series, titled James May: Our Man in Japan, May's journey is presented as a linear journey traveling from the north end of Japan, via Sapporo and Tokyo to the south island. Production started in March 2019, with the show being filmed over the course of three months. In August 2021 it was confirmed that a second series, set in the United States, had been commissioned. However, in October 2021 it was announced that filming in the United States could not go ahead as planned due to various restrictions as a result of the COVID-19 pandemic, and instead series two saw May touring Italy, titled James May: Our Man in Italy. The series takes him from Palermo in Sicily to the Dolomites. A third series titled James May: Our Man in India was reportedly ordered in February 2023; a release date has not been announced.

The concept had originally been pitched to the BBC a number of years earlier, but not commissioned.

Episodes

Series 1: Our Man in Japan (2020)
During the episodes May is accompanied by a series of guides/translators.

Series 2: Our Man in Italy (2022)

Release 

Lucy Mangan for The Guardian gave the first series three out of five stars. She praised the travelogue's inclusion of "under-publicised aspects of the [Japanese] culture" but noted May's interaction with the television crew as low-brow and "strenuously jocular".

References

External links
 
 Official website for US Viewers 
 

2020 British television series debuts
2020s British documentary television series
English-language television shows
Amazon Prime Video original programming
Television series about Japan
Television series about Italy
Our Man In